The 2019–20 Maine Black Bears women's basketball team represents the University of Maine in the 2019–20 NCAA Division I women's basketball season. The Black Bears, led by third-year head coach Amy Vachon, play their home games at the Cross Insurance Center and are members of the America East Conference.

Media
All home games and conference road games will stream on either ESPN3 or AmericaEast.tv. Most road games will stream on the opponents website. All games will be broadcast on the radio on WGUY and online on the Maine Portal.

Roster

Schedule and results

|-
!colspan=9 style=| Exhibition

|-
!colspan=9 style=| Non-conference regular season

|-
!colspan=9 style=| America East regular Season

|-
!colspan=9 style=| America East Women's Tournament

See also
2019–20 Maine Black Bears men's basketball team

References

Maine Black Bears women's basketball seasons
Maine Black Bears
Maine Black Bears women's basketball
Maine Black Bears women's basketball